Northern Cree, also known as the Northern Cree Singers, is a powwow and Round Dance drum and singing group, based in Maskwacis, Alberta, Canada. Formed in 1980 (or 1982) by Randy Wood, with brothers Charlie and Earl Wood of the Saddle Lake Cree Nation (Plains Indian music), members originate from the Treaty 6 area. These include Ferlin McGillvary, Steve Wood, Joel Wood, as well as Conan Yellowbird.

Regarded as one of the best acts in modern Native American powwow music, they have been named one of the most respected pow-wow groups in North America and the world. The group, or their music, has been described as  remarkably unified and powerful, attention-grabbing, and energetic.

They have been nominated for six Grammy Awards and nominated for two Juno Awards. In 2017, the Singers, along with founder Randy Wood and Tanya Tagaq, won a Juno Award for Classical Album of the Year – Large Ensemble for the album Going Home Star.

Discography
According to Allmusic they have over twenty albums out; according to their website they have released 37, mostly live recordings, on Canyon Records. Albums include:
 Rockin' the Rez (2001)
 Still Rezin (2003)
 Northern Cree & Friends, Vol. 5: Long Winter Nights (2006)
 Stay Red (2006)
 Red Rock: Pow-Wow Songs Recorded Live at Muckleshoot (2008)
 True Blue (2009)
 Temptations: Cree Round Dance Songs (2010) It's a Cree Thing (2016)
 Ewipihcihk: ᐁᐏᐱᐦᒋᐦᐠ ["to go Round Dancing (with)," or, "he/she goes Round Dancing (with)"] (2016)
Nitisanak - Brothers and Sister (2018)

They were featured in the film Grey Owl (1999). They are featured on the album Gathering of Nations Pow Wow 1999 (2000, Soar Records), which won a Grammy in 2001. The group is featured in the song and music video "Indomitable" by DJ Shub, which was nominated for Best EDM/Dance Video in the 2017 iHeartRadio Much Music Video Awards and won Best Music Video in the Native American Music Awards. They are featured on the CDs which accompany David Bouchard's children's books in Cree and English: Nokum Is My Teacher (2006) and The Drum Calls Softly (2008), both on Red Deer Press.

Awards and nominations

Members
 Charlie Wood
 Earl Wood
 Ferlin McGilvery
 Joel Wood
 Steve Wood

References

First Nations musical groups
Juno Award for Classical Album of the Year – Large Ensemble or Soloist(s) with Large Ensemble Accompaniment winners
Musical groups from Alberta
Plains Indian music
Cree culture